Kharak Khurd is a village in the Bhiwani district of the Indian state of Haryana.

Demographics 
, the village had 990 households with a population of 5,113, of which 2,703 were male and 2,410 were female. Most of the population belongs to the Rajput caste.

Geography 
Because Kharak Kalan and Kharak Khurd are adjacent it is difficult to identify a boundary between the two. The main place of worship in Kharak Khurd is Dadi Tamoli Devi, a large temple situated in the north of the village. 

Most villagers depend on farming for their livelihood. The Dadari feeder canal provides the main source of agricultural irrigation in the area.

Kharak Khurd is well connected via road and rail. Kalinga is the nearest village, located approximately four kilometers from Kharak. 

There are six main areas in the village: 

 Andha pana 
 lalu pana 
 Balhan Pana
 Nathu Pana 
 Shuru Pana
 Bagu Pana

Politics 
Kharak Khurd is represented in the legislature by Bishmbhar Balmiki, a member of the legislative Assembly from the Bharatiya Janta Party.

References

Villages in Bhiwani district